Oier Sanjurjo Maté (born 25 May 1986), known simply as Oier, is a Spanish professional footballer who plays as a defender or a defensive midfielder for Cypriot club AEK Larnaca.

He spent the vast majority of his career with Osasuna, making 356 appearances.

Club career

Osasuna
Oier was born in Estella-Lizarra, Navarre. A product of hometown CD Izarra's youth academy, he completed his development at neighbouring club CA Osasuna. He made his La Liga debut on 24 September 2008 in a game against Deportivo de La Coruña, coming on for Nacho Monreal in the tenth minute of an eventual 0–0 home draw. Although he spent most of the season with the reserves, he still managed a further nine league appearances.

In his first full professional campaign, Oier started the first five matches at right back as starter César Azpilicueta was away on international duty. He found his chances limited after the latter's return, and was subsequently loaned to RC Celta de Vigo on 11 July 2011.

After being a starter for the Galicians as the season ended in promotion, Oier returned to Osasuna and renewed his contract until 2015. He scored two goals from 28 appearances in 2012–13, but the team returned to Segunda División after a 14-year stay.

Oier extended his contract for three years in June 2015, and in December 2018 this was lengthened to 2020 with a buyout clause of €8 million while the side remained in the second tier. He finished that season as captain of the champions.

After returning to the top flight, Oier earned two new renewals, allowing him to skipper the club during its centenary in 2020. On 31 October that year, in a 3–1 home loss to Atlético Madrid, he made his 300th official appearance for the team but also gave away a penalty by handball.

AEK Larnaca
Oier moved abroad for the first time at the age of 36, joining AEK Larnaca FC of the Cypriot First Division.

International career
Oier was never capped by Spain at any level. He did play for the Basque Country representative team, starting from a friendly against Venezuela in December 2010.

Career statistics

Honours
Osasuna
Segunda División: 2018–19

References

External links

1986 births
Living people
People from Estella Oriental
Spanish footballers
Footballers from Navarre
Association football defenders
Association football midfielders
Association football utility players
La Liga players
Segunda División players
Segunda División B players
CD Izarra footballers
CA Osasuna B players
CA Osasuna players
RC Celta de Vigo players
Cypriot First Division players
AEK Larnaca FC players
Basque Country international footballers
Spanish expatriate footballers
Expatriate footballers in Cyprus
Spanish expatriate sportspeople in Cyprus